State Correctional Institution – Smithfield is a Close-Security correctional facility for men on the grounds of SCI-Huntingdon, near Huntingdon in the Allegheny Mountains. SCI Smithfield was opened in 1988 during a "growth spurt of the "bursting at the seams" correctional system in the Commonwealth of Pennsylvania.

Notable prisoners 

 George Feigley, sex cult leader

See also
 State Correctional Institution - Huntingdon
 List of Pennsylvania State Prisons

References

External links
 PA Department of Corrections - SCI Smithfield

Prisons in Pennsylvania
Buildings and structures in Huntingdon County, Pennsylvania
1988 establishments in Pennsylvania